Jenna Randall (born 20 September 1988) is an English former Synchronised swimmer who represented Great Britain at the Olympic Games in Beijing 2008 and London 2012. She is also a three-time Commonwealth Games silver medallist.

Personal life
Randall was born  in Ascot, Berkshire, England and educated at Hurst Lodge School, Ascot. She is the older sister of synchronised swimmer Asha Randall.

Career
Jenna first competed at the Commonwealth Games in 2006 in Melbourne where she won the silver medal in the women's solo event. At the 2010 Commonwealth Games in Delhi, India, Randall again won the silver medal in the women's solo event and teamed up with Olivia Allison to win silver in the women's duet.

Randall has competed at two Olympic Games. In Beijing 2008 she finished fourteenth in the duet event with Olivia Federici (then known as Olivia Allison), while at the London 2012 Games she finished ninth in the duet, again with Federici and sixth in the team event.

Jenna announced her retirement from synchronised swimming in 2013.

References 

1988 births
British synchronised swimmers
Commonwealth Games silver medallists for England
Living people
Olympic synchronised swimmers of Great Britain
People educated at Hurst Lodge School
Synchronised swimmers at the 2006 Commonwealth Games
Synchronised swimmers at the 2010 Commonwealth Games
Synchronized swimmers at the 2008 Summer Olympics
Synchronized swimmers at the 2012 Summer Olympics
Commonwealth Games medallists in synchronised swimming
Medallists at the 2006 Commonwealth Games
Medallists at the 2010 Commonwealth Games